In numerical analysis, Richardson extrapolation is a sequence acceleration method used to improve the rate of convergence of a sequence of estimates of some value . It is named after Lewis Fry Richardson, who introduced the technique in the early 20th century, though the idea was already known to Christiaan Huygens in his calculation of π. In the words of Birkhoff and Rota, "its usefulness for practical computations can hardly be overestimated." 

Practical applications of Richardson extrapolation include Romberg integration, which applies Richardson extrapolation to the trapezoid rule, and the Bulirsch–Stoer algorithm for solving ordinary differential equations.

General formula

Notation 
Let  be an approximation of (exact value) that depends on a positive step size h with an error formula of the form 

Furthermore,  represents the truncation error of the  approximation such that  Similarly, in  the approximation  is said to be an  approximation.

Note that by simplifying with Big O notation, the following formulae are equivalent:

Purpose 
 for the same step size . This process can be repeated to remove more error terms to get even better approximations.

Process 

Recurrence relation 
A general recurrence relation can be defined for the approximations by

where  satisfies
.

Properties 
The Richardson extrapolation can be considered as a linear sequence transformation.

Additionally, the general formula can be used to estimate  (leading order step size behavior of Truncation error) when neither its value nor  is known a priori. Such a technique can be useful for quantifying an unknown rate of convergence.

Example of Richardson extrapolation
Suppose that we wish to approximate , and we have a method  that depends on a small parameter  in such a way that

Very often, it is much easier to obtain a given precision by using R(h) rather than A(h′) with a much smaller h′. Where A(h′) can cause problems due to limited precision (rounding errors) and/or due to the increasing number of calculations needed (see examples below).

Example pseudocode code for Richardson extrapolation

The following pseudocode in MATLAB style demonstrates Richardson extrapolation to help solve the ODE ,  with the Trapezoidal method. In this example we halve the step size  each iteration and so in the discussion above we'd have that . This pseudocode assumes that a function called Trapezoidal(f, tStart, tEnd, h, y0) exists which attempts to compute y(tEnd) by performing the trapezoidal method on the function f, with starting point y0 and tStart and step size h.

Note that starting with too small an initial step size can potentially introduce error into the final solution. Although there are methods designed to help pick the best initial step size, one option is to start with a large step size and then to allow the Richardson extrapolation to reduce the step size each iteration until the error reaches the desired tolerance.

tStart = 0          % Starting time
tEnd = 5            % Ending time
f = -y^2            % The derivative of y, so y' = f(t, y(t)) = -y^2
                    % The solution to this ODE is y = 1/(1 + t)
y0 = 1              % The initial position (i.e. y0 = y(tStart) = y(0) = 1)
tolerance = 10^-11  % 10 digit accuracy is desired

maxRows = 20                % Don't allow the iteration to continue indefinitely
initialH = tStart - tEnd    % Pick an initial step size
haveWeFoundSolution = false % Were we able to find the solution to within the desired tolerance? not yet.

h = initialH

% Create a 2D matrix of size maxRows by maxRows to hold the Richardson extrapolates
% Note that this will be a lower triangular matrix and that at most two rows are actually
% needed at any time in the computation.
A = zeroMatrix(maxRows, maxRows)

%Compute the top left element of the matrix. The first row of this (lower triangular) matrix has now been filled.
A(1, 1) = Trapezoidal(f, tStart, tEnd, h, y0)

% Each row of the matrix requires one call to Trapezoidal
% This loops starts by filling the second row of the matrix, since the first row was computed above
for i = 1 : maxRows - 1 % Starting at i = 1, iterate at most maxRows - 1 times
    h = h/2             % Halve the previous value of h since this is the start of a new row.
    
    % Starting filling row i+1 from the left by calling the Trapezoidal function with this new smaller step size
    A(i + 1, 1) = Trapezoidal(f, tStart, tEnd, h, y0)
    
    for j = 1 : i     % Go across this current (i+1)-th row until the diagonal is reached
        % To compute A(i + 1, j + 1), which is the next Richardson extrapolate, 
        % use the most recently computed value (i.e. A(i + 1, j)) and the value from the
        % row above it (i.e. A(i, j)).
     
        A(i + 1, j + 1) = ((4^j).*A(i + 1, j) - A(i, j))/(4^j - 1);
    end
    
    % After leaving the above inner loop, the diagonal element of row i + 1 has been computed
    % This diagonal element is the latest Richardson extrapolate to be computed.
    % The difference between this extrapolate and the last extrapolate of row i is a good
    % indication of the error.
    if (absoluteValue(A(i + 1, i + 1) - A(i, i)) < tolerance)  % If the result is within tolerance
        print("y = ", A(i + 1, i + 1))                         % Display the result of the Richardson extrapolation
        haveWeFoundSolution = true
        break                                                  % Done, so leave the loop
    end
end

if (haveWeFoundSolution == false)   % If we were not able to find a solution to within the desired tolerance
    print("Warning: Not able to find solution to within the desired tolerance of ", tolerance);
    print("The last computed extrapolate was ", A(maxRows, maxRows))
end

See also
 Aitken's delta-squared process
 Takebe Kenko
 Richardson iteration

References

Extrapolation Methods. Theory and Practice by C. Brezinski and M. Redivo Zaglia, North-Holland, 1991.
Ivan Dimov, Zahari Zlatev, Istvan Farago, Agnes Havasi: Richardson Extrapolation: Practical Aspects and Applications'', Walter de Gruyter GmbH & Co KG,  (2017).

External links
Fundamental Methods of Numerical Extrapolation With Applications, mit.edu
Richardson-Extrapolation
 Richardson extrapolation on a website of Robert Israel (University of British Columbia) 
 Matlab code for generic Richardson extrapolation.
 Julia code for generic Richardson extrapolation.

Numerical analysis
Extrapolation
Articles with example MATLAB/Octave code